The Shawnee Mission Post is a United States nonpartisan subscription-based online newspaper founded in 2010. It is updated daily, Mondays through Fridays.

History 
Upon their return in 2010 from volunteer Peace Corps postings in Panama, Jay Senter and Julia Westhoff, a couple who had worked together on their college newspaper found that media coverage of their home in northern Johnson County, Kansas, lacked coverage of government and school news. In response, they started a news website At first, they called their publication, the Prairie Village Post. 
As they broadened their extent of their coverage, they adopted the name, Shawnee Mission Post.

The intent of the publishers was to focus on local news, most particularly in Northern Johnson County, Kansas. To that end, they covered municipal affairs in the sixteen towns within the Postal-designated area Shawnee Mission, as well as school district meetings and news. They have also covered state legislators and federal representatives from the 3rd Congressional district and the U.S. Senate.

They received advice and assistance from publisher emeritus Dan Blom. By 2014, 35,000 unique visitors per month were logging on.

By 2019, the number of unique visitors had grown to almost 300,000 and paid subscribers to the site to 3,700, paying an average of $72 annually.

"Shawnee Mission" is not the name of a municipality, but rather refers to a postal area designation that incorporates all or parts of 16 cities and towns with Zip Codes in North and Northeast Johnson County Kansas. It borders southwest Kansas City, Kansas The towns include Leawood, Lenexa, Mission, Mission Hills, Overland Park (partial), Prairie Village, Roeland Park, Shawnee, and Westwood. If those towns were a single municipality, they would constitute the second largest city in Kansas, with a population of over 400,000.

The Shawnee Mission Post has part of their site covered by a paywall, noting that the people who pay want "More civics.  Fewer restaurants."  This may not work for other news outlets, but it seems to be working for the Shawnee Mission Post. 

The Shawnee Mission Post is a member of both the Kansas Press Association and Local Independent Online News Publishers (LION).

Personnel 
Kyle Palmer, senior editor
Julia Westhoff, Director of Sales and Subscriptions

References

External links

2000 establishments in the United States
American news websites
Internet properties established in 2010
Mass media in the Kansas City metropolitan area